Lee So-ra (Hangul: 이소라, Hanja: 李蘇羅; born 1 September 1987) is a South Korean female professional volleyball player. She was part of the silver medal winning team at the 2010 Asian Games.

References

1987 births
Living people
South Korean women's volleyball players
Asian Games medalists in volleyball
Volleyball players at the 2010 Asian Games
Medalists at the 2010 Asian Games
Asian Games silver medalists for South Korea